Poritia is a genus of lycaenid butterflies. The species of this genus are found in the Indomalayan realm. Poritia was erected by Frederic Moore in 1887.

Species
Poritia erycinoides (C. Felder & R. Felder, 1865)
Poritia fruhstorferi Corbet, 1940
Poritia hewitsoni Moore, [1866]
Poritia hewitsoni ampsaga Fruhstorfer, 1912
Poritia hewitsoni hewitsoni
Poritia hewitsoni kiyokoae Morita & Yago, 2004
Poritia hewitsoni solitaria Schröder & Treadaway, 1989
Poritia hewitsoni taleva Corbet, 1940
Poritia hewitsoni tavoyana Doherty, 1889
Poritia ibrahimi Eliot & Kirton, 2000
Poritia karennia Evans, 1921
Poritia kinoshitai Hayashi, 1976
Poritia languana Schröder & Treadaway, 1986
Poritia manilia Fruhstorfer, 1912
Poritia palos Osada, 1987
Poritia personata Osada, 1994
Poritia phalena (Hewitson, 1874) (mostly placed in Simiskina)
Poritia phama H. H. Druce, 1895
Poritia philota Hewitson, 1874
Poritia phormedon H. H. Druce, 1895
Poritia plateni Staudinger, 1889
Poritia pleurata Hewitson, 1874
Poritia promula Hewitson, 1874
Poritia sumatrae (C. Felder & R. Felder, 1865)

References 
, 1940. A revision of the Malayan species of Poritiinae (Lepidoptera: Lycaenidae). Transactions of the Royal Entomological Society of London. 90: 337–350, 1 pl., 21 figs.
, 1948. Revisional Notes on Oriental Lycaenidae: 1. Proceedings of the Royal Entomological Society of London (B) 17 (7/8) :93-97.
, 1957. Notes on the genus Poritia Moore. Entomologist 90: 70–74, 18 figs.
, 1980. New information on the butterflies of the Malay Peninsula. The Malay Nature Journal 33 (3/4): 137: 155.
, 1986. Additions and nomenclatural changes to the Lycaenid and Hesperiid butterflires of the Malay Peninsula. Malayan Nature Journal 39: 221–224.
, 1919. Revision der Gattung Poritia auf Grund der Morphologie der Generatsionsorgane. Archiv für Naturgeschichte. (A) 83 (2): 77-101.
, [1866]. On the lepidopterous insects of Bengal. Proceedings of the Zoological Society of London. 1865: 755-823, 3 pls.
 , 2004: A new subspecies of Poritia hewitsoni  from Langkawi and its surrounding islands, Malaysia (Lepidoptera, Lycaenidae). Futao 47: 16–19.
 , 2010: Two new subspecies of Poritia erycinoides from Anambas Isls., Indonesia, and Langkawi Is., Malaysia (Lepidoptera, Lycaenidae). Futao 56: 17–19.
  1994: A further contribution to a knowledge on Poritiinae from Sulawesi, Indonesia. Futao 15: 5-13.
  1994: New subspecies of Poritia from the Philippines (Lepidoptera: Lycaenidae). Futao 15: 14–15.

  1994: Descriptions of new Lycaenidae (Lepidoptera) from Paramalaya (1). Futao 15: 20–25.
, 1989. On some type specimens of Lycaenidae from South East Asia. Tyô to Ga 40 (1): 23–80. Abstract and full article: .
, 1995. Checklist of the butterflies of the Philippine Islands (Lepidoptera: Rhopalocera) Nachrichten des Entomologischen Vereins Apollo Suppl. 14: 7–118.
 , 2012: Revised checklist of the butterflies of the Philippine Islands (Lepidoptera: Rhopalocera). Nachrichten des Entomologischen Vereins Apollo, Suppl. 20: 1-64.

External links

 With images.
"Poritia Moore 1886". Tree of Life Web Project.
Inayoshi, Y. & Saito, K. (November 30, 2019). "Family Lycaenidae Subfamily Poritiinae". A Check List of Butterflies in Indo-China.

 
Poritiinae
Lycaenidae genera
Taxa named by Frederic Moore